Martin Michel Mimoun (born 11 June 1992) is a French professional footballer who plays as a midfielder.

Career

Martin started his football career at INF Clairefontaine before he proceeded to Paris Saint-Germain Academy in 2003.

In 2010, Martin signed for French club Stade Laval and went on to make 25 league appearances for the club.

Olimpija Ljubljana
On 7 July 2015, Martin secured a three-year footballing contract with Slovenian side Olimpija Ljubljana on a free transfer. He left the club only a year later, when he terminated his contract on 9 August 2016.

Virton
In February 2019, he moved to Virton.

Personal life
Mimoun is the grandson of the former football coach Michel Le Millinaire. His father, Nordine Mimoun, is of Algerian and Moroccan descent and also was a footballer.

Honours
Olimpija Ljubljana
Slovenian PrvaLiga: 2015–16

References

External links

Martin Mimoun profile at NZS 

1992 births
Living people
French people of Breton descent
French sportspeople of Moroccan descent
French sportspeople of Algerian descent
French footballers
Association football midfielders
Ligue 2 players
Slovenian PrvaLiga players
Championnat National players
Championnat National 2 players
Championnat National 3 players
Liga I players
Belgian Third Division players
Stade Lavallois players
US Quevilly-Rouen Métropole players
NK Olimpija Ljubljana (2005) players
US Créteil-Lusitanos players
SC Bastia players
Paris FC players
FC Politehnica Iași (2010) players
R.E. Virton players
Les Herbiers VF players
FC Villefranche Beaujolais players
French expatriate footballers
French expatriate sportspeople in Slovenia
Expatriate footballers in Slovenia
French expatriate sportspeople in Romania
Expatriate footballers in Romania
French expatriate sportspeople in Belgium
Expatriate footballers in Belgium